Neochlamisus gibbosus is a species of warty leaf beetle in the family Chrysomelidae. It is found in Central America and North America. Biology and morphology of all life stages of this species have been described from field study of live populations on Rubus laudatus Berger (Rosaceae) in Kansas. They lay one egg at a time. Females will cover the egg in frass, making a bell-shaped covering for the egg. Larvae will also create cases to attach their body to the host plant when molting. When threatened, they will release a yellow liquid.

References

Further reading

 

Cryptocephalinae
Articles created by Qbugbot
Beetles described in 1777
Beetles of North America